Lionel Alejandro Nicolás Laborda (born 3 March 1999) is an Argentine professional footballer who plays as a midfielder for San Telmo.

Career
Laborda was produced by the Boca Juniors academy, they signed him following a two-year spell with Barcelona La Candela. On 29 January 2019, Laborda completed a loan move to Primera B Nacional's Arsenal de Sarandí until the summer 2020. Sergio Rondina picked the midfielder on the substitutes bench for fixtures with Central Córdoba and Almagro in early March 2019, prior to substituting him on during a goalless draw at home to Platense on 11 March. Arsenal was promoted to the Argentine Primera División for the 2019-20 season and since then, Laborda played with Arsenal's reserve team. Laborda was then recalled at the end of 2019.

After a long trial period, Laborda signed a deal with Tigre in August 2021. However, he never played an official game for the club, before leaving in January 2022 to join San Telmo.

Career statistics
.

References

External links

1999 births
Living people
Place of birth missing (living people)
Argentine footballers
Association football midfielders
Primera Nacional players
Boca Juniors footballers
Arsenal de Sarandí footballers
Club Atlético Tigre footballers
San Telmo footballers